The 2016 Moscow Sevens is the opening tournament of the 2016 Sevens Grand Prix Series. It will be held over the weekend of 4–5 June 2016.

Teams
12 teams participated in the tournament. In preparation for the 2016 Olympics, instead of England, Scotland, and Wales fielding individual teams, two unified Great Britain teams will compete.

 
  University
 
 
  Royals
  Lions

Pool Stage

Pool A

Pool B

Pool C

Knockout stage

Bowl

Plate

Cup

References

2016
2016 in Russian rugby union
Grand Prix 1
June 2016 sports events in Russia